Doria Paston (née Dorothy Paston Fisher, 1893, Kandy - 1989, East Lambrook) was an English actress and set designer who worked with Terence Gray at the Cambridge Festival Theatre in the 1920s and 1930s. With Gray she co-published the programmes for the plays they put on as the Cambridge Festival Theatre Review.

Early life
She was born Dorothy the daughter of Lionel Paston Fisher and his wife Emma Wood Locket, who were married in Kandy, Ceylon in 1893.

Work at Cambridge Festival Theatre
The architect Hugh Casson learnt set design from her, although he did not share her commitment to abstract and cubist set design.

Godfishers
Doria settled in East Lambrook with her friend Molly Godlonton. The two women were known as the Godfishers and played a role in the community life the Kingsbury Episcopi, where East Lambrook is located. Doria provided paintings while Molly took photographs, many of which have been archived by a local resident. They organised a number of exhibitions of their pictures to raise money for guide dogs for the blind.

References

1893 births
1989 deaths
20th-century English actors
Set designers
English people of Sri Lankan descent
Sri Lankan people of English descent